A by-election was held for the New South Wales Legislative Assembly electorate of Goldfields West on 26 February 1867 because of the resignation of Stephen Donnelly.

Dates

Result

The by-election was caused by the resignation of Stephen Donnelly.

See also
Electoral results for the district of Goldfields West
List of New South Wales state by-elections

References

1867 elections in Australia
New South Wales state by-elections
1860s in New South Wales